The following table indicates the party of elected officials in the U.S. state of Maryland:

Governor
Lieutenant Governor
Attorney General
State Comptroller

The table also indicates the historical party composition in the:

State Senate
State House of Delegates
State delegation to the United States Senate
State delegation to the United States House of Representatives

For years in which a presidential election was held, the table indicates which party's nominees received the state's electoral votes.

1777–1851

1851–present

See also
Politics in Maryland
Government of Maryland

Politics of Maryland
Government of Maryland
Maryland